Free roam may refer to:

 Free roam game, in video gaming
 A roaming type in wireless telecommunication
 A feral animal

See also
 Freedom to roam
 Free range (disambiguation)
 Open range